West Branch Township is a civil township of Dickinson County in the U.S. state of Michigan. As of the 2010 census, the township population was 63, slightly down from 67 at the 2000 census. The population density is 0.565/sq mi (0.218/km2) which ranks the township as the second least-densely populated municipality in the state of Michigan after Seney Township.

Communities
There are no incorporated municipalities in the township. 
Alfred is a tiny locale at  near where the north branch of the Ford River joins the main branch. It was a stop on the Escanaba and Lake Superior Railway. A post office operated there from 1903 until 1910.

Geography
According to the United States Census Bureau, the township has a total area of 111.8 square miles (289.7 km), of which, 111.5 square miles (288.7 km) of it is land and 0.4 square miles (1.0 km) of it (0.35%) is water.

Demographics
As of the census of 2000, there were 67 people, 29 households, and 18 families residing in the township. The population density was 0.6 per square mile (0.2/km). There were 150 housing units at an average density of 1.3 per square mile (0.5/km). The racial makeup of the township was 89.55% White, 5.97% Native American, and 4.48% from two or more races. Hispanic or Latino of any race were 4.48% of the population. 16.1% were of Finnish, 10.7% English, 10.7% Swedish, 8.9% French, 8.9% Polish, 7.1% American, 5.4% Dutch and 5.4% German ancestry according to Census 2000.

There were 29 households, out of which 20.7% had children under the age of 18 living with them, 51.7% were married couples living together, 6.9% had a female householder with no husband present, and 37.9% were non-families. 24.1% of all households were made up of individuals, and 10.3% had someone living alone who was 65 years of age or older. The average household size was 2.31 and the average family size was 2.78.

In the township the population was spread out, with 16.4% under the age of 18, 6.0% from 18 to 24, 13.4% from 25 to 44, 44.8% from 45 to 64, and 19.4% who were 65 years of age or older. The median age was 49 years. For every 100 females, there were 123.3 males. For every 100 females age 18 and over, there were 124.0 males.

The median income for a household in the township was $21,875, and the median income for a family was $19,583. Males had a median income of $33,750 versus $18,750 for females. The per capita income for the township was $12,286. There were 11.1% of families and 11.4% of the population living below the poverty line, including no under eighteens and 20.0% of those over 64.

References

Townships in Dickinson County, Michigan
Iron Mountain micropolitan area
Townships in Michigan